Villers-sous-Saint-Leu (literally Villers under Saint-Leu) is a commune in the Oise department in northern France.

See also
 Communes of the Oise department

References

External links

 Official site

Communes of Oise